Antoine de Mornable (fl. 1540s) was a French composer who was maitre de chapelle for count Guy de Laval in 1546. His best known work is the chanson "Je ne scay", recorded by artists including the Kings Singers (1973). His works include two volumes of French psalms for Huguenot use.

References

16th-century French composers
French classical composers
French male classical composers
Renaissance composers